This timeline lists important events relevant to the life of the Vaishnava (Hindu) spiritual leader, poet, commentator, educationist, religious and social figure Rambhadracharya (1950 – present).

Jagadguru Ramanandacharya was born on 14 January 1950 as Giridhar Mishra. He is one of four incumbent Jagadguru Ramanandacharya, and has held this title since 1988.

He is the establisher and head of Tulsi Peeth, a religious and social service institution named after saint Tulsidas, located in Chitrakoot. He is the founder and lifelong chancellor of the Jagadguru Rambhadracharya Handicapped University in Chitrakoot, which offers graduate and postgraduate courses exclusively to four types of disabled students. Rambhadracharya has been blind since the age of two months. He has never used Braille or any other aid to learn or compose.

Rambhadracharya can speak 22 languages, and is a spontaneous poet, and writer in Sanskrit, Hindi, Awadhi, Maithili, and several other languages. He has composed more than 90 works, including four epic poems, a Hindi commentary on Tulsidas' Ramcharitmanas, a Sanskrit commentary in verse on the Ashtadhyayi, and Sanskrit commentaries on the Prasthanatrayi scriptures. He is regarded as one of the greatest authorities on Tulsidas in India, and is the editor of a critical edition of the Ramcharitmanas. He is Katha artist for the Ramayana and the Bhagavata. His Katha programmes are held regularly in different cities in India and other countries, and are telecast on television channels like Sanskar TV and Sanatan TV.

Timeline

1950
January 14:Born as Giridhar Mishra in Shandikhurd village of Jaunpur district to mother Shachidevi and father Pandit Rajdev Mishra.
March 24:Eyes got infected by trachoma.

1953
Composed his first piece of poetry—in Awadhi (a dialect of Hindi).
June:Had a near-death experience when fell in a small dry well.

1955
Memorised the entire Bhagavad Gita.
Janmashtami:Recited the entire Bhagavad Gita.

1957
Memorised the entire Ramcharitmanas.
Rama Navami:Recited the entire Ramcharitmanas while fasting.

1961
Had his Upanayana performed and given the Gayatri Mantra.
Was stopped from joining his family in a wedding procession due to his disability.

1967
July 7 - Joined the Adarsh Gaurishankar Sanskrit College.

1971
Enrolled at the Sampurnanand Sanskrit University.

1974
Topped the final examination for the Shastri (Bachelor of Arts) degree in Sanskrit grammar
Won five gold medals at the Akhila Bharatiya Sanskrit Adhiveshan.

1976
Topped the final examination for the Acharya (Master of Arts) degree in Sanskrit grammar.
Narrated a Katha on Ramcharitmanas to Swami Karpatri.
Won gold medal for standing first in all-India Sanskrit debate competition and a Chancellor's Gold Medal from by the Sampurnanand Sanskrit University.
April 30 - Was declared Acharya of all subjects taught at the Sampurnanand Sanskrit University.

1979
Observed his first Payovrata.

1980
Wrote a Hindi minor poem Kākā Vidura, a Sanskrit minor poem Mukundasmaraṇam and a Hindi discourse Bharata Mahimā.

1981
Wrote a Sanskrit dissertation (PhD thesis) Adhyātmarāmāyaṇe Apāṇinīyaprayogānāṃ Vimarśaḥ.
October 14 - Completed his Vidyavaridhi degree in Sanskrit grammar.

1982
Wrote a Hindi minor poem Mā̐ Śabarī and a  Hindi deliberation Mānasa Me̐ Tāpasa Prasaṅga.

1983
Wrote a Hindi commentary on Hanuman Chalisa Mahavīrī.
November 19 - Took Virakta Diksha in the Ramananda Sampradaya.

1985
Wrote a Hindi discourse Sugrīva Kā Agha Aura Vibhīṣaṇa Kī Karatūti and a Hindi commentary on the Bhagavad Gita Śrīgītātātparya.

1987
Established a religious and social service institution called Tulsi Peeth.
Wrote a Sanskrit hymn of praise Śrījānakīkṛpākaṭākṣastotram.

1988
Wrote a Hindi deliberation Sanātanadharma Kī Vigrahasvarūpa Gomātā and a Hindi investigative research Śrītulasīsāhitya me̐ Kṛṣṇa Kathā.
June 24 - Chosen as the Jagadguru Ramanandacharya seated at the Tulsi Peeth.

1989
Wrote a Hindi discourse Mānasa me̐ Sumitrā.

1990
Wrote a Hindi critique Sīta Nirvāsana Nahī̐.

1991
Wrote a Sanskrit commentary on the Narada Bhakti Sutra Śrīnāradabhaktisūtreṣu Śrīrāghavakṛpābhāṣyam.

1992
Wrote a Sanskrit hymn of praise Śrīrāmavallabhāstotram and a Hindi discourse Prabhu Kari Kṛpā Pā̐varī Dīnhī.

1993
Wrote a Hindi lyrical poem Bhaktigītasudhā and a Hindi discourse Parama Baḍabhāgī Jaṭāyu.

1994
Wrote a Hindi epic poem Arundhatī.
Wrote a Sanskrit hymn of praise Śrīgaṅgāmahimnastotram.

1995
Wrote a Sanskrit hymn of praise Śrīcitrakūṭavihāryaṣṭakam.
August 1 - Ritually anointed as the Jagadguru Ramanandacharya.

1996
Wrote a Sanskrit minor poem Ājādacandraśekharacaritam.
Wrote a Single-act Sanskrit play-poem Śrīrāghavābhyudayam.
August 23 - Established the Tulsi School for the Blind.

1997
Wrote a Sanskrit commentary Aṣṭādhyāyyāḥ Pratisūtraṃ Śābdabodhasamīkṣaṇam.
Wrote a Sanskrit poem Śrīrāmabhaktisarvasvam.
May 9 - Was awarded the post-doctorate Vachaspati (DLitt) degree by Sampurnanand Sanskrit University.

1998
Got the title of Dharmachakravarti by the World Religious Parliament.

1999
Won the Kaviraj Vidya Narayan Shastri Archana-Samman Award from the Kaviraj Vidya Narayan Shastri Archana-Samman Committee, Bhagalpur and the Mahakavi title by the Akhil Bharatiya Hindi Bhasha Sammelan, Bihar.

2000
Won the Vishishta Puraskar from the Uttar Pradesh Sanskrit Samsthana, Lucknow and the Mahamahopadhyay title by the Lal Bahadur Shastri Sanskrit Vidyapeeth, New Delhi.
Wrote a Sanskrit minor poem Sarayūlaharī.

2001
Wrote a Sanskrit minor poem Laghuraghuvaram.
September 27 - Founded the Jagadguru Rambhadracharya Handicapped University.

2002
Won the Kavikularatna title from Sampurnanand Sanskrit University, Varanasi.
Wrote a Sanskrit epic poem Śrībhārgavarāghavīyam, a Sanskrit minor poem Śrīrāghavabhāvadarśanam, a Sanskrit commentary on the Rāmastavarājastotra Śrīrāmastavarājastotre Śrīrāghavakṛpābhāṣyam and a Hindi discourse Śrī Sītārāma Vivāha Darśana.

2003
Won the Rajshekhar Samman from the Madhya Pradesh Sanskrit Academy, Bhopal, the Bhaurao Deoras Award by the Bhaurao Deoras Seva Nyas, Lucknow, the Diwaliben Award by the Dewaliben Mehta Charitable Trust, Mumbai and the Ativishishta Puraskar by the Uttar Pradesh Sanskrit Samsthana, Lucknow.
Wrote a Sanskrit letter poem Kubjāpatram.
July - Deposed as an expert witness in the Ram Janmabhoomi Babri Masjid dispute case in the Allahabad High Court.

2004
Won the Awadh Ratna title from the Awadh Vikas Parishad, Allahabad and the Badarayana Puraskar.
Wrote a Sanskrit minor poem Bhṛṅgadūtam and a Hindi discourse Tuma Pāvaka Ma̐ha Karahu Nivāsā.

2005
Wrote a Hindi commentary on the Ramcharitmanas Bhāvārthabodhinī.
Won the Sahitya Akademi Award for Sanskrit for Śrībhārgavarāghavīyam.

2006
Won the Sanskrit Mahamahopadhyay title from the Hindi Sahitya Sammelan, Prayag, the Shreevani Alankaran award from the Jaydayal Dalmiya Shri Vani Trust and the Banabhatta Award from the Madhya Pradesh Sanskrit Board, Bhopal.
Wrote a Hindi discourse Ahalyoddhāra.

2007
Won the Goswami Tulsidas Samarchan Samman from the Tulsi Research Institute, Municipal Corporation, Allahabad and the Vachaspati Award by the K. K. Birla Foundation, New Delhi.
Wrote a Hindi deliberation on Rāsapañcādhyāyī Śrīrāsapañcādhyāyīvimarśaḥ.
November 27 - Received a letter telling him and his disciples either to accept Islam or to be prepared to die.
November 30 - Released the first Braille version of the Bhagavad Gita.

2008
Wrote a Hindi discourse Ahalyoddhāra.
Wrote a Hindi Rītikāvya Hara Te Bhe Hanumāna.

2009
Wrote a Sanskrit suprabhatam Śrīsītārāmasuprabhātam.
November - Accused of tampering with the Ramcharitmanas.

2010
Wrote a Hindi epic poem Aṣṭāvakra.

2011
Won the Tulsi Award 2011 from Morari Bapu and the Dev Bhumi Award from the Government of Himachal Pradesh, Shimla.
Wrote a Sanskrit lyrical epic poem Gītarāmāyaṇam, a Awadhi lyrical poem Avadha Kai Ajoriyā and a Sanskrit minor poem Śrīsītāsudhānidhiḥ.

2014
November - Nominated by the Indian Prime Minister Narendra Modi for the Clean India Campaign.

2015
January 25 - Awarded Padma Vibhushan, India's second highest civilian honour.

See also

Works of Rambhadracharya

Notes

References

Works cited

 
 
 
 
 
 
 
 
 
 
 
 
 
 
 
 
 
 
 
 

Personal timelines